Public Relations Consultants Association of India (PRCAI) is a trade organization that represents India's public relations consultancy sector. It is the summit body for official communications and public relations practices in India. It was formed in October 2001 to grow, represent and support India's public relations consultancy sector in international practices. It also provides a forum for Government, public bodies, industry associations, trade and others to confer with public relations consultants as a body. It is internationally recognized organization which offers official membership to all PR practitioners which abide by the basic criteria devised by the association.

Establishment
PRCAI was established on 4 October 2001. On the lines of the Public Relations and Communications Association in the United Kingdom, it was formed and mooted by various public relations firms of India. It is affiliated with International Consultancy Communications Organization (ICCO) which is an international association for all national communication consultancy organizations headquartered in UK.

Members
Members include professionals from Corporate Voice Weber Shandwick, Genesis Burson Marsteller, Hanmer MSL, Text 100, Good Relations India, Ogilvy PR and 20:20 Media (now 20:20 MSL).

Managing committee
Nitin Mantri, CEO and Founder, Avian Media took over as President of PRCAI from Sharif D Rangnekar, CEO & Director, Integral PR in April 2015. The team has devised self-regulatory guidelines on ethics, standards norms. In 2011, PRCAI aligned with European Public Affairs Consultancies Association (EPACA) to formulate norms for government engagement activities, to ensure higher level of transparency.
The members, speakers and associates of PRCAI represent belong to corporate firms, agencies, freelance communications professionals, public affairs organizations, Digital PR firms and professional services firms.

Recent achievements
PRCAI has recently released the ‘PRCAI Trends Report 2013’ that is addressed towards issues surrounding the PR industry in India. The report consists of data collected from around 54 PR executives, including CEO's and Chairman's from India. This PRCAI report, identified growth challenges for 2013 like creating new demand, managing client expectations, hiring new resources and managing costs.

References

Professional associations based in India